Ahmad Hasan (also Romanized as Aḩmad Ḩasan and Āḥmadḥasan; also known as Kūl-e Aḩmad Ḩasan) is a village in Zalaqi-ye Gharbi Rural District, Besharat District, Aligudarz County, Lorestan Province, Iran. At the 2006 census, its population was 26, in 4 families.

References 

Towns and villages in Aligudarz County